Johanna Allik (born 7 April 1994, in Tallinn) is an Estonian figure skater. While competing in singles skating, she has won two senior international medals and is a two-time Estonian national silver medalist (2008, 2010). She switched to ice dance in 2011 and won the 2012 Estonian junior title with partner Paul Bellantuono. After a two-season hiatus from competitive skating from 2013–2015, she returned to singles skating for the 2015–16 figure skating season.

Programs

Single skating

With Bellantuono

Competitive highlights
CS: Challenger Series; JGP: Junior Grand Prix

Singles career

Ice dancing with Bellantuono

References

External links

Tracings.net profile

Estonian female single skaters
Estonian female ice dancers
1994 births
Living people
Figure skaters from Tallinn